Next Digital Limited, previously known as Next Media Limited, was the largest listed media company in Hong Kong.

Founded by Jimmy Lai, it had 2,095 employees as of 30 Sep 2020. The media outlet had a user base of 5.0 million monthly unique visitors in Hong Kong, 12.3 million monthly unique visitors in Taiwan, 1.7 million in the US and 399,0002 in Canada up till 2019. Apple Daily, the newspaper of the media group, was the most read newspaper in the city. The company became defunct in 15 December 2021.

History 
From 20 October 2015, the company has changed its English name to Next Digital Limited, from Next Media Limited.

Raid by the police 

On 10th August 2020, Jimmy Lai, the founder of Next Digital, was arrested by the Hong Kong Police early morning that day for alleged collusion with foreign powers after a Beijing-led investigation. A post on Twitter from the media group's executive, Mark Simon, confirmed the arrest. The Committee to Protect Journalists (CPJ) reported that "the arrest of media tycoon Jimmy Lai bears out the worst fears that Hong Kong’s National Security Law would be used to suppress critical pro-democracy opinion and restrict press freedom". Steven Butler, CPJ's Asia program coordinator, commented, "Jimmy Lai should be released at once and any charges dropped."
The Hong Kong Police made arrest of seven people aged 39 to 72 who have been accused of violating the new security law. The arrestees included Jimmy Lai (Founder of Next Digital Limited), Cheung Kim Hung (CEO of Next Digital Limited), Chow Tat Kuen, Royston (executive director and CFO of Next Digital Limited).

Political position 
The news media has often offered explicit, proactive support for pro-democracy groups in Hong Kong.  The paper is regarded to hold libertarian views on financial and economic issues.

Controversy 

The media group made an entrance into the industry by introducing tabloid-style journalism, along with making mainstream reporting (see middle-market newspaper), to Hong Kong as well as Taiwan. It was the first to use massive graphics, bold headlines and full colour pages now common to all best-selling papers in both regions. In earlier years, criticism was drawn for sensational articles found in an entertainment magazine under the media group. A notable scandal was aired in 2006 in relation to Gillian Chung, a member of singing group Twins, who was photographed changing clothes at the backstage from a concealed camera alleged to be put there by the paparazzi. The incident triggered debates over the ethics and regulations of paparazzi activities in Hong Kong.

Under a grim political climate, the news outlet's intrepid political activism infuriated the Beijing regime. Some companies with ties to China had refrained from putting advertisements on any publication of the media group due to the heightened political pressure exerted on the business bodies in the city.

Next Media's irreverent probe into sensitive social topics is what believed to be the reason of a triad-style vandalism targeted at the press offices, followed by the forced shut-down in 2021.

The news outlet's distancing from the Beijing regime is also what gives the press a healthy boundary that allows for curb-free journalistic coverage and wins the support from the general public. A slew of news articles authored by journalists from Next Media had received recognition through news awards such as Human Rights Press Awards, Investigative Feature Writing, Excellence in Reporting on Women's Issues, Hong Kong News Awards, Hong Kong Institute of Professional Photographers Awards, Excellence in Video Reporting, Spot News Photography Prizes, Chinese-Language Cartoon / Illustration Merit, Chinese-Language News Merits, etc. On the day of shutdown, queues of citizens snapped up the total 1 million copies of Apple Daily’s last print, marking a sensational end to the paper’s decades of journalism and a symbol of Hong Kong's media pluralism.

Hong Kong publications 

 Apple Daily – Formerly one of Hong Kong's largest circulation newspapers, which was published daily between 1995 and 2021.
 Next Magazine – Published on Wednesday evenings, one of Hong Kong's largest circulation news and entertainment magazines between 1990 and 2021.
 Easy Finder – A teen-focused entertainment magazine.

Monday Book – A set of four magazines sold together for HK$12 on Monday mornings that are more thematically male and commercially focused.
 Face – Gossip, entertainment and fashion
 Ketchup – Gadgets, gaming and mobile
 JobFinder – Jobs and recruitment magazine (sales assistant-level jobs)
 AutoExpress – Used cars, auto insurance, dating advertisements, car license plates for sale.
 Trading Express – Classified ads for products, small companies, second-hand watches.

Friday Book – A set of three magazines sold together for HK$12 on Friday mornings that are more thematically female and leisure-focused. At the end of 2008, Next Media relinquished its holding in these three magazines, whose editorial management since early 2009 has been tied to TVB Weekly (the official magazine of Television Broadcasts Limited and owned by a joint venture between Malaysian media conglomerate company Astro All Asia Networks plc (Astro) and Albert Yeung's Emperor Group).
 Eat and Travel Weekly – Sold to Astro in November 2006.
 Sudden Weekly – Women-oriented entertainment magazine. Sold to Astro in November 2006.
 Me – A cosmetics and fashion magazine. Founded by Astro in December 2006.

Hong Kong websites 
The Atnext.com network is the No. 1 online Chinese new, information and current events portal from Hong Kong and reaches more than 2 million users per month, audited by Neilsen//Netratings.

Vertical/community portals
In addition to original exclusive content and social networking tools, these sites aggregate content from all other sites.

 Lady – Female-focused portal with strong community
 Travel – Travel site
 Education – education guide for students of all levels
 Motor – Car vertical covering auto reviews and more
 Life – lifestyle guide on everyday city living
 Racing – a subscription-based horse racing guide focused on HK and Macau races (HK$1,888 per year)
 Soccer – soccer fans' guide to everything soccer
 Health – a vertical channel on medical and health

Taiwan publications 
 Apple Daily – Published daily, one of Taiwan's highest-circulation newspapers
 Sharp Daily – A free daily newspaper
 Next Magazine – Published on weekly, one of Taiwan's largest circulation news and entertainment magazines
 Me (Taiwan version) – A weekly magazine

Structure of Next Media 
The top management committee of the company is the Board. The Board is responsible for overseeing the successful of Next Media and devising the company's future strategy. The Board delegates the running of Next Media's day-to-day operations to carefully chosen executive directors and senior management. The Board looks to the management to ensure it is apprised of all significant developments that may affect the company and its operations.

There are four committees established by the Board, granted for different kinds of duties.
 Executive Directors: for the purpose of approving issues and allotment of shares
 Audit Committee: mainly to assist the Board in its oversight of the integrity of the company's financial statements; the company's compliance with legal and regulatory requirements; the external auditor's qualifications and independence; and the performance of the company's internal audit function and external auditors.
 Remuneration Committee; to review and develop policies in relation to the remuneration of directors and senior management of the company; to make recommendations to the Board from time to time as may be necessary in relation to such policies.
 Ad hoc Sub-committee; made up of the financial heads of all major operation subsidiaries.

Senior leadership 
Note: Senior leadership only reflects the structure since the Group's listing in 1999; previously, it was a private company with no formal structure

List of chairmen 

 Jimmy Lai Chee-ying (1999–2014); executive chairman
Cassian Cheung Ka-sing (interim Chairman 2014–2016); executive chairman
Ip Yut-kin (2016–2018); non-executive chairman
Jimmy Lai Chee-ying (2018–2020); second term; non-executive between 2018 and 2020; executive for part of 2020
Ip Yut-kin (2020–2021)

List of chief executives 
Note: The position of Chief Executive was not used during the years 2002–2006, as the then-Executive Chairman Jimmy Lai took on CEO responsibilities from his post

 Lim Tai-thong (2000)
 Pieter Lodewijk Schats (2001)
 Stephen Ting Ka-yu (2007)
 Jimmy Lai Chee-ying (2008)
 Chu Wah-hui (2008–2010)
 Chu Wah-hui and Cassian Cheung Ka-sing (2010–2011)
 Cassian Cheung Ka-sing (2011–2014; interim CEO 2014–2016)
 Cheung Kim-hung (2018–2021)

Subsidiaries
 Apple Daily Limited
 Apple Daily Online Limited
 Apple Daily Printing Limited
 Cameron Printing Company Limited
 Database Gateway Limited
 Easy Finder Limited
 Easy Finder Hong Kong Marketing Limited
 Easy Media Limited
 Eat and Travel Weekly Company Limited
 Next Media Animation Limited
 Next Magazine Advertising Limited
 Next Magazine Publishing Limited
 Next Media Group Management Limited
 Next Media Hong Kong/Publication Publishing Limited
 Paramount Printing Company Limited
 Rainbow Graphic & Printing Company Limited
 Sudden Weekly Limited

References

External links
 Official website
 Company Profile
 Celebrities seek tougher privacy laws (The Standard, 1 February 2007) 
 Source: Pinyin translated with CozyChinese.COM

 
Companies listed on the Hong Kong Stock Exchange
Mass media companies of Hong Kong
Magazine publishing companies of Hong Kong
Newspaper companies of Hong Kong
2021 disestablishments in Hong Kong